Jashn-e-Rekhta is the world's largest Urdu language literary festival. It is a three-day event held annually in New Delhi that celebrates the Urdu language. The festival showcases Urdu poetry, Urdu literature, Qawwali, Islamic calligraphy, with performances such as Ghazal, Sufi music, recitations, panel discussions, debates, conversations on films, and calligraphy workshops. It also includes shopping and a food festival. It provides a platform for Urdu lovers to share their poetry and stories in various open forums. The slogan of the festival is "Celebrating Urdu", and it is attended by a huge number of Urdu enthusiasts, especially youth.

History 
The festival was first held in 2015. It is organised by the Rekhta Foundation, a non-profit organization that is devoted to the preservation and promotion of the Urdu language and culture.

Notable participants 
Jashn-e-Rekhta has seen participation from dozens of Urdu writers and prominent names from the film, music and TV industry from India, Pakistan, and the United States, including: 
 Javed Akhtar
 Imtiaz Ali
 Muzaffar Ali
 Tom Alter
 Shabana Azmi
 Wasim Barelvi
 Rekha Bhardwaj
 Wadali Brothers
 Prem Chopra
 Nandita Das
 Shamsur Rahman Faruqi
 Ali Akbar Natiq
 Nida Fazli
 Gulzar
 Hans Raj Hans
 Intizar Hussain
 Rahat Indori
 Javed Jaffrey
 Pandit Jasraj
 Prasoon Joshi
 Annu Kapoor
 Irrfan Khan
 Rafaqat Ali Khan
 Ustad Amjad Ali Khan
 Ustad Hamid Ali Khan
 Ustad Rashid Khan
 Anwar Maqsood
 Anwar Masood
 Zia Mohyeddin
 Shubha Mudgal
 Gopi Chand Narang
 Munawwar Rana
 Shilpa Rao
 Waheeda Rehman
 Nawazuddin Siddiqui
 Sharmila Tagore
 Maithili Thakur
 Amish Tripathi
 Harshdeep Kaur 
 Zakir Khan
 Kumar Vishwas

Critical Views
Jashn-e-Rekhta received criticism from various corners due to its emphasis on Hindi and English scripts in expressing the Urdu literature. Rizwan Ahmad argued that "The first few editions did not have the Jashn-e-Rekhta written in Urdu. Recent ones did include the Urdu script, but the schedules were available only in English. The big ‘I LOVE URDU’ cut-out where the youth were seen taking pictures was only in English. Both speak volumes about the targeted audience".

References

External links
 Jashn-e-Rekhta
Rekhta Foundation

Literary festivals in India
Festivals in Delhi